Geshe Lhundrup Rigsel (sometimes called Lama Lhundrup) was abbot of Kopan Monastery in Nepal. He was born in 1941 to a poor peasant family in Tibet, and joined Sera Monastery as a boy. In 1959 he fled from the Chinese invasion of Tibet and went to India. 
-
In Buxa, a refugee camp in Northern India, he met Lama Thubten Yeshe and Lama Zopa. In the late sixties he journeyed to South India to start the clearing of land for the new Sera Monastic University. He received his Doctor of Divinity in Buddhist studies from Sera.

In 1972 Geshe Lhundrup Rigsel was called to Kopan Monastery by Lama Yeshe, to teach Buddhist philosophy to the monks. The Dalai Lama appointed him abbot of Kopan Monastery in February 2000. As of 2011, Geshe Rigsel was on the board of directors of the Foundation for the Preservation of the Mahayana Tradition.

On September 7, 2011 Lama Lhundrup died due to cancer

See also
Gelug
Lam Rim

References

External links
A Day in the Life of an FPMT Lama
Khensur Rinpoche Lama Lhundrup, Mandala Magazine, 2011.
Khensur Rinpoche Geshe Lama Lhundrup Rigsel's Biography video

Lamas from Tibet
Year of birth missing
2011 deaths
20th-century lamas